Music for People, Birds, Butterflies and Mosquitoes is an album by American jazz composer and arranger Jimmy Giuffre which was released on the Choice label in 1973.

Reception

Scott Yanow of Allmusic states: "The music is moody, fairly spontaneous, and melodic, but often wandering and rather insubstantial... None of the songs clock in over 5:37, and although they form a sort of suite, the overall results are not too memorable".

Track listing 
All compositions by Jimmy Giuffre
 "Mosquito Dance" - 5:37
 "Night Dance" - 4:11
 "Flute Song" - 2:37
 "Eternal Chant" - 2:58
 "The Bird" - 2:44
 "The Waiting" - 3:25
 "The Butterfly" - 2:26
 "The Chanting" - 4:42
 "Moonlight" - 3:39
 "Dervish" - 3:31
 "Phoenix" - 5:04
 "Feast Dance" - 3:23

Personnel 
Jimmy Giuffre - tenor saxophone, clarinet, flute, bass flute
Kiyoshi Tokunaga - bass
Randy Kaye - percussion

References 

Jimmy Giuffre albums
1973 albums